The Dutch Steam Museum is a historical and science museum and former pumping station located on the IJsselmeer at Medemblik in the Netherlands. Constructed in 1869, the steam engines operated until the completion of an electric pumping station at Wervershoof in 1975. The museum is opened during the summer and tells the history of steam engines and the industrial revolution.

External links

Dutch Monument Register (in Dutch)

Science museums in the Netherlands
Museums in North Holland
Steam museums
Former pumping stations